Mikołajki  is a resort town in Mrągowo County in the Warmian-Masurian Voivodeship in north-eastern Poland, with 3,852 inhabitants as of 2017. The town is located near the Śniardwy, the largest lake of both the Masurian Lake District and Poland. It is located in the center of the ethnocultural region of Masuria.

History 

Mikołajki is an old Masurian church town first documented as Nickelsdorf (Sankt Niklas) in 1444 and Niklasdorf in 1493. The name refers to Saint Nicholas (Mikołaj in Polish). Early on, it was part of the State of the Teutonic Order. In 1454 Polish King Casimir IV Jagiellon incorporated the region to the Kingdom of Poland upon the request of the anti-Teutonic Prussian Confederation, and the Thirteen Years' War broke out. After the war ended in 1466 it was part of Poland, as a fiefdom held by the Teutonic Knights and, from 1525 on, the Duchy of Prussia, founded as a vassal state of Poland. Similar to all of Masuria, it was mainly inhabited by Poles, hailing from nearby Masovia. In 1539 the inhabitants of the settlement were almost entirely Poles, who called it by its Polish name Mikołajki. First Protestant pastors were mentioned in 1552. The settlement, now within the Kingdom of Prussia, grew during the 18th century, receiving its town privileges as Nikolaiken in 1726. Because of its location on Śniardwy, the fishery of Nikolaiken ensured continued prosperity; the whitefish of the region were especially popular throughout the province of East Prussia.

From 1871 it was part of the German Empire, located within the Sensburg district (Landkreis Sensburg) within the province of East Prussia. However, in 1877, the population was still predominantly Polish, mostly of Protestant confession. In the 1898 German federal election, the Polish candidate of the Masurian People's Party, Zenon Eugeniusz Lewandowski, who originated from Poznań and was supported by the German Free-minded People's Party, received 50% of votes in Mikolajki. 
As a result of the treaty of Versailles the 1920 East Prussian plebiscite was organized on 11 July 1920 under the control of the League of nations, which resulted in 1,800 votes to remain in Germany and none for Poland. During World War II it was one of the few Masurian towns not destroyed from the fighting, following the war it became again part of Poland under its Polish name Mikołajki. The German-speaking population was evacuated and expelled by Polish and Soviet soldiers in accordance to the Potsdam Agreement.

The town was a growing tourist center before the war, and is now one of the largest tourist sights in Masuria. The ice sailing in winter is an especially popular attraction.

Climate
Mikołajki has an oceanic climate  (Köppen climate classification: Cfb) using the  isotherm or a humid continental climate (Köppen climate classification: Dfb) using the  isotherm.

Sports
Since 2005, the Rally of Poland has been based in Mikołajki.

The local football team is Kłobuk Mikołajki. It competes in the lower leagues.

Gallery

International relations

Twin towns — Sister cities
Mikołajki is twinned with:
  Villard-de-Lans, France
  Varėna, Lithuania

References

External links

Mikołajki, at Phorum website
 

Cities and towns in Warmian-Masurian Voivodeship
Mrągowo County